The Commodity Distribution Reform Act and WIC Amendments of 1987 (P.L. 100-237) (January 8, 1988) established a free-standing law requiring the USDA to improve the distribution and quality of commodities donated to child nutrition programs.  It also established a foodbank demonstration project making use of Section 32 agricultural surplus
commodities, amended the National School Lunch Act (P.L. 79-396) to permit certain pilot projects receiving cash in lieu of commodities or commodity letters of credit to continue receiving them, and amended the Child Nutrition Act of 1966 (P.L. 89-642) to make a variety of changes to the WIC program to expand coordination with other programs, conduct studies, and convert certain food funding to use for administrative costs.

References 

United States federal agriculture legislation